The 2009–10 Temple Owls men's basketball team represented Temple University in the 2009–10 NCAA Division I men's basketball season. They were led by head coach Fran Dunphy and played their home games at the Liacouras Center. The Owls are members of the Atlantic 10 Conference. They finished the season 29–6, 14–2 in A-10 play to claim a share of the regular season championship. They won the 2010 Atlantic 10 men's basketball tournament for the third consecutive year to receive the conferences automatic bid to the 2010 NCAA Division I men's basketball tournament. They received a 5 seed in the East Region where they were upset in the first round by 12 seed Cornell.

Preseason
The team is set to play their home games at Liacouras Center, which has a capacity of 10,206. They are in their 28th season as a member of the Atlantic 10 Conference. Coming back from their 2008–09 season, they compiled a record of 22–12 and won the Atlantic 10 men's basketball tournament for the second consecutive year.

However, Temple lost star player Dionte Christmas to graduation, whom Blue Ribbon Yearbook said that, if "anything good that happened to the Owls last year, Christmas had a hand in it." He led Temple in three statistics: points per game (19.5), three-pointers completed  (107), and total steals (51); he finished second in two more: rebounds per game (5.5) and assists (28). In addition, he was an honorable mention All-American and scored 2,000 points over his college basketball career. Also graduating were two other starters: 7–0 center Sergio Olmos, who was selected as an All-A10 Tournament player, and point guard Semaj Inge.

Temple's schedule was announced on September 3, 2009, consisting of a school record-tying 31 games in the regular season. The out-of-conference portion, adopted on July 21, was regarded as one of the toughest in college hoops. The highlights of it include: Georgetown and Siena, which began the season ranked; Virginia Tech, a competitor in the Atlantic Coast Conference; Penn State, who won the 2009 National Invitation Tournament; and Villanova and Kansas, two top 10 teams.

Due to these factors, Temple was picked to finish fifth in the conference by the Atlantic 10 Preseason Poll, tied with Duquesne. Lavoy Allen was the only team member selected on the Preseason All-Atlantic 10 First Team. The Blue Ribbon Yearbook gave the backcourt a grade of B, the frontcourt a B, the bench/depth a C+, and the intangibles a B+. They commented that "the Owls have had a way the last couple years of surprising people," and that while Temple "might still surprise some people, but don't expect it to be with an NCAA Tournament berth."

Recruiting

Incoming signees

2010–11 team recruits

Roster

Players

Coaches

Schedule

|- align="center" bgcolor="#D8FFEB"
| 1
| November 14
| Delaware
| W 76–56
| Ryan Brooks – 23
| Lavoy Allen – 15
| Juan Fernandez – 5
| Bob Carpenter Center, Newark, DE (3,080)
| 1–0
|- align="center" bgcolor="#FFE6E6"
| 2
| November 17
| Georgetown (#19)
| L 46–45
| Allen – 12
| Allen – 14
| Luiz Guzman – 6
| Verizon Center, Washington, DC (8,712)
| 1–1
|- align="center" bgcolor="#D8FFEB"
| 3
| November 21
| Siena
| W 73–69
| Fernandez – 20
| Allen – 7
| Allen – 5
| Liacouras Center, Philadelphia, PA (6,759)
| 2–1
|- align="center" bgcolor="#D8FFEB"
| 4
| November 24
| Ball State
| W 66–46
| Brooks – 17
| Allen – 9
| Allen/Brooks – 7
| Liacouras Center, Philadelphia, PA (3,597)
| 3–1
|- align="center" bgcolor="#D8FFEB"
| 5
| November 27
| Virginia Tech
| W 61–50
| Allen – 18
| Allen – 10
| Fernandez – 6
| Palestra, Philadelphia, PA (3,750)
| 4–1
|- align="center" bgcolor="#FFE6E6"
| 6
| November 28
| St. John's
| L 55–48
| Ramone Moore – 10
| Rahlir Jefferson – 12
| Fernandez – 4
| Palestra, Philadelphia, PA (3,469)
| 4–2
|-

|- align="center" bgcolor="#D8FFEB"
| 7
| December 1
| Western Michigan
| W 76–70
| Brooks – 17
| Brooks – 10
| Guzman – 6
| University Arena in Read Fieldhouse, Kalamazoo, MI (3,086)
| 5–2
|- align="center" bgcolor="#D8FFEB"
| 8
| December 5
| Penn State
| W 45–42
| Brooks – 19
| Allen – 12
| Fernandez – 4
| Liacouras Center, Philadelphia, PA (7,012)
| 6–2
|- align="center" bgcolor="#D8FFEB"
| 9
| December 8
| Miami (OH)
| W 64–42
| Allen – 15
| Allen – 7
| Allen/Fernandez – 4
| John D. Millett Hall, Miami, OH (1,457)
| 7–2
|- align="center" bgcolor="#D8FFEB"
| 10
| December 13
| Villanova (#3)
| W 75–65
| Fernandez – 33
| Allen – 17
| Guzman – 7
| Liacouras Center, Philadelphia, PA (8,449)
| 8–2
|- align="center" bgcolor="#D8FFEB"
| 11
| December 19
| Seton Hall
| W 71–65
| Brooks – 24
| Allen – 12
| Brooks – 3
| Prudential Center, Newark, NJ (7,100)
| 9–2
|- align="center" bgcolor="#D8FFEB"
| 12
| December 28
| Bowling Green
| W 63–39
| Brooks – 19
| Allen – 13
| Brooks – 6
| Liacouras Center, Philadelphia, PA (3,900)
| 10–2
|- align="center" bgcolor="#D8FFEB"
| 13
| December 30
| Northern Illinois
| W 70–60
| Fernandez – 26
| Allen – 11
| Brooks – 4
| Convocation Center, DeKalb, IL (1,234)
| 11–2
|-

|- align="center" bgcolor="#FFE6E6"
| 14
| January 2
| Kansas (#1)
| L 84–52
| Brooks/Fernandez – 11
| Guzman – 6
| Allen/Brooks/Fernandez/Guzman – 2
| Liacouras Center, Philadelphia, PA (10,206)
| 11–3
|- align="center" bgcolor="#D8FFEB"
| 15
| January 6
| St. Joseph's
| W 73–46
| Allen – 20
| Allen – 11
| Craig Williams/Guzman/Moore – 3
| Liacouras Center, Philadelphia, PA (6,103)
| 12–3(1–0)
|- align="center" bgcolor="#D8FFEB"
| 16
| January 10
| Rhode Island (#32)
| W 68–64 (OT)
| Fernandez – 18
| Allen – 12
| Fernandez – 4
| Thomas M. Ryan Center, Kingston, RI (6,122)
| 13–3(2–0)
|- align="center" bgcolor="#D8FFEB"
| 17
| January 13
| Pennsylvania
| W 60–45
| Brooks – 15
| Allen/Guzman – 6
| Brooks/Fernandez – 3
| Palestra, Philadelphia, Pennsylvania (6,353)
| 14–3
|- align="center" bgcolor="#D8FFEB"
| 18
| January 16
| Massachusetts
| W 76–64
| Brooks – 29
| Allen – 14
| Guzman – 7
| Liacouras Center, Philadelphia, PA (4,263)
| 15–3(3–0)
|- align="center" bgcolor="#D8FFEB"
| 19
| January 20
| Xavier
| W 77–72
| Brooks – 22
| Allen/Brooks – 7
| Fernandez – 7
| Liacouras Center, Philadelphia, PA (6,813)
| 16–3(4–0)
|- align="center" bgcolor="#D8FFEB"
| 20
| January 23
| Fordham
| W 62–45
| Fernandez – 13
| Micheal Eric – 5
| Brooks – 6
| Rose Hill Gym, New York, NY (2,690)
| 17–3(5–0)
|- align="center" bgcolor="#FFE6E6"
| 21
| January 27
| Charlotte
| L 74–64
| Brooks – 20
| Allen – 14
| Fernandez – 6
| Dale F. Halton Arena, Charlotte, NC (7,623)
| 17–4(5–1)
|- align="center" bgcolor="#D8FFEB"
| 22
| January 30
| La Salle
| W 64–52
| Moore – 14
| Allen – 10
| Allen/Guzman – 5
| Liacouras Center, Philadelphia, PA (8,501)
| 18–4(6–1)
|-

|- align="center" bgcolor="#D8FFEB"
| 23
| February 3
| Duquesne
| W 76–60
| Moore – 15
| Allen – 15
| Guzman – 4
| Liacouras Center, Philadelphia, PA (4,391)
| 19–4(7–1)
|- align="center" bgcolor="#FFE6E6"
| 24
| February 6
| Richmond
| L 71–54
| Allen/Moore – 17
| Allen – 19
| Guzman – 3
| Robins Center, Richmond, VA (6,806)
| 19–5(7–2)
|- align="center" bgcolor="#D8FFEB"
| 25
| February 13
| Rhode Island
| W 78–56
| Eric – 19
| Allen/Guzman – 7
| Fernandez – 6
| Liacouras Center, Philadelphia, PA (7,080)
| 20–5(8–2)
|- align="center" bgcolor="#D8FFEB"
| 26
| February 17
| St. Bonaventure
| W 73–55
| Moore – 18
| Allen – 6
| Fernandez – 5
| Reilly Center, St. Bonaventure, NY (4,522)
| 21–5(9–2)
|- align="center" bgcolor="#D8FFEB"
| 27
| February 20
| St. Joseph's
| W 75–67 (OT)
| Moore – 24
| Allen – 10
| Guzman – 4
| Hagan Arena, Philadelphia, PA (8,151)
| 22–5(10–2)
|- align="center" bgcolor="#D8FFEB"
| 28
| February 24
| Dayton
| W 49–41
| Moore – 13
| Allen – 17
| Guzman – 7
| Liacouras Center, Philadelphia, PA (5,833)
| 23–5(11–2)
|- align="center" bgcolor="#D8FFEB"
| 29
| February 28
| La Salle
| W 68–53
| Fernandez – 23
| Allen – 21
| Guzman – 7
| Tom Gola Arena, Philadelphia, PA (4,000)
| 24–5(12–2)
|-

|- align="center" bgcolor="#D8FFEB"
| 30
| March 3
| St. Louis
| W 57–51
| Allen – 18
| Allen – 14
| Guzman – 4
| Chaifetz Arena, St. Louis, MO (7,984)
| 25–5(13–2)
|- align="center" bgcolor="#D8FFEB"
| 31
| March 6
| George Washington
| W 70–57
| Eric – 18
| Eric – 6
| Fernandez – 5
| Liacouras Center, Philadelphia, PA (6,356)
| 26–5(14–2)
|- align="center" bgcolor="#D8FFEB"
| 32
| March 12
| St. Bonaventure
| W 69–51
| Fernandez – 17
| Allen – 15
| Fernandez – 7
| Boardwalk Hall, Atlantic City, NJA-10 tournament quarterfinals
| 27–5
|- align="center" bgcolor="#D8FFEB"
| 33
| March 13
| Rhode Island
| W 57–44
| Brooks – 16
| Allen – 10
| Fernandez – 6
| Boardwalk Hall, Atlantic City, NJA-10 Tournament semifinals
| 28–5
|- align="center" bgcolor="#D8FFEB"
| 34
| March 14
| Richmond
| W 56–52
| Fernandez – 18
| Allen – 11
| Allen – 3
| Boardwalk Hall, Atlantic City, NJA-10 Tournament finals (7,882)
| 29–5
|- align="center" bgcolor="#FFE6E6"
| 35
| March 19
| Cornell (12 Seed)
| L 65–78
| Fernandez/Brooks – 14
| Allen – 5
| Allen – 4
| Jacksonville Veterans Memorial Arena, Jacksonville, FLNCAA tournament  First round (10,657)
| 29–6
|-

Season

Preconference season
The Owls kicked off their season on November 14, 2009 with a 76–56 win against the University of Delaware, sending the Fighting Blue Hens to their fourth straight loss as a home opener. On November 17, the Owls failed to capitalize on preseason No. 19 Georgetown Hoyas' sloppy play, as the Hoyas were victorious 45–46. The game featured more fouls (18) and turnovers (16) than completed baskets (15) for Georgetown, playing their home opener at the Verizon Center. Georgetown led 19–13 at halftime, but Temple managed to mount a comeback, as they led with 6 seconds left in regulation until Hoya Greg Monroe scored the winning 3-pointer. After the game, Temple's 68-game winning streak when opponents scored less than 50 points was crushed.

On November 21, Temple beat the Siena Saints, after overcoming a six-point deficit at the half to end the game at 73–69. As a result, the Owls began receiving votes in the 2008-09 NCAA Division I men's basketball rankings for the week of November 23. After an easy win against Ball State on November 24, the Owls next faced Virginia Tech in the semifinals of the Philly Hoop Group Classic. Temple overcame Malcolm Delaney's 32 points to defeat the Hokies 60–51 on November 27. Their 4–1 start was the Owls' best since 2000.

The team suffered their second loss of the season by the undefeated Red Storm of St. John's on November 28, in the championship game of the Philly Hoop Group Classic. Temple led 22–21 at the half, but the Red Storm went on a 14–2 run in the beginning of the second half from which the Owls could not recover, and St. John's won 55–48. This caused Temple to lose all support in the national rankings. The Owls rebounded with three consecutive wins: against Western Michigan, Penn State, and Miami (Ohio). The Penn State game was notable in that it was the second lowest scoring game in the 13-year history of the Liacouras Center. Ryan Brooks's 19 points, the only Owl scoring in double figures, helped lead Temple over the Nittany Lions 45–42 in the largely defensive matchup.

Temple entered the top 25 in national rankings for the first time since 2001.

Atlantic 10 regular season

Postseason

Rankings

Awards & honors
Lavoy Allen
Preseason All-Atlantic 10 First Team
November 30, 2009 Philadelphia Big Five Player of the Week
November 30, 2009 Temple University Athlete of the Week
December 14, 2009 Philadelphia Big Five Honor Roll
January 11, 2010 Philadelphia Big Five Player of the Week
January 11, 2010 Temple University Athlete of the Week

Ryan Brooks
November 16, 2009 Philadelphia Big Five Honor Roll
December 7, 2009 Philadelphia Big Five Honor Roll
December 21, 2009 Philadelphia Big Five Player of the Week
December 21, 2009 Temple University Athlete of the Week
January 4, 2010 Philadelphia Big Five Honor Roll

Juan Fernandez
December 14, 2009 Philadelphia Big Five Player of the Week
December 14, 2009 Temple University Athlete of the Week
December 20, 2009 A-10 Player of the Week
January 6, 2010 Temple University Athlete of the Month

Statistical leadership

References

Temple
Temple Owls men's basketball seasons
Temple
Temple
Temple